Verkhny Khoteml is a rural locality and the administrative center of Verkhnekhotemlsky Selsoviet Rural Settlement, Fatezhsky District, Kursk Oblast, Russia. Population:

Geography 
The village is located on the Verkhny Khoteml Brook (a link tributary of the Usozha in the basin of the Svapa), 101 km from the Russia–Ukraine border, 37 km north-west of Kursk, 8 km south of the district center – the town Fatezh.

 Climate
Verkhny Khoteml has a warm-summer humid continental climate (Dfb in the Köppen climate classification).

Transport 
Verkhny Khoteml is located 2 km from the federal route  Crimea Highway as part of the European route E105, 9.5 km from the road of regional importance  (Fatezh – Dmitriyev), 28.5 km from the road  (Kursk – Ponyri), 4 km from the road  (Fatezh – 38K-018), on the road of intermunicipal significance  (M2 "Crimea Highway" – Verkhny Khoteml), 33 km from the nearest railway halt Bukreyevka (railway line Oryol – Kursk).

The rural locality is situated 40 km from Kursk Vostochny Airport, 159 km from Belgorod International Airport and 231 km from Voronezh Peter the Great Airport.

References

Notes

Sources

Rural localities in Fatezhsky District